Charles Constantin (born April 30, 1954) is a Canadian former professional ice hockey left winger.

Early life 
Constantin was born in Montreal, Quebec. He played junior hockey with the Quebec Remparts.

Career 
Constantin was drafted by the Quebec Nordiques in the second round, 24th overall, of the 1974 WHA Amateur Draft. He was also drafted by the Buffalo Sabres of the National Hockey League, through he never played in the league.

He played 192 games in the World Hockey Association, 186 with the Nordiques and six with the Indianapolis Racers. He scored 28 goals and 35 assists.

External links

References 

1954 births
Living people
Buffalo Sabres draft picks
Canadian ice hockey left wingers
Ice hockey people from Montreal
Indianapolis Racers players
Quebec Nordiques (WHA) draft picks
Quebec Nordiques (WHA) players
Quebec Remparts players